Baptiste Chouzenoux (born 7 August 1993) is a French professional rugby union player. He plays at flanker for Racing 92 in the Top 14.

References

External links
Racing 92 Profile
Ligue Nationale De Rugby Profile
European Professional Club Rugby Profile

1993 births
Living people
French rugby union players
Sportspeople from Bayonne
Aviron Bayonnais players
Racing 92 players
Rugby union flankers